Geraldine Elizabeth "Liz" Carmichael was an American automobile executive and convicted fraudster. During the 1970s energy crisis, Carmichael promoted  a prototype for a low-cost fuel-efficient car via Twentieth Century Motor Car Corporation, but fled with investor money. She was captured in 1989, and served 18 months on fraud charges.

Early life
Geraldine Elizabeth Carmichael was a transgender woman who before transitioning used the name Jerry Dean Michael in Indiana in 1927. She grew up in Jasonville, Indiana, later moving to Detroit, Michigan with her family.

Relationships
According to the FBI, Carmichael married four times while identifying as Jerry Dean Michael. She was charged with desertion for leaving her first wife, Marga, whom she met while stationed in Germany, and their two children. In 1954, she married a woman named Juanita, with whom she had two children before their relationship ended in 1956. In 1958, she married a woman named Betty Sweets after knowing her for four weeks. They conceived a daughter, but the marriage ended within a year. In 1959, she married Vivian Barrett Michael, her fourth wife, and together they had five children.

Career and legal issues
In 1961, she was arrested for counterfeiting U.S. currency in the Los Angeles, California, area. She jumped bail and went on the run in 1962 with Vivian and their children.

While on the run, Carmichael faked a serious car accident in an effort to shed her identity as Jerry Dean Michael. She changed her name to Liz Carmichael in the late 1960s. She often introduced her wife Vivian Barrett Michael as her secretary.

In 1973, still on the run from her 1961 arrest, Carmichael was working at the United States Marketing Institute (USMI), in Los Angeles. There she met Dale Clifft, who had invented a three-wheeled car with low gas consumption. With Clifft, she left the USMI to form the Twentieth Century Motor Car Corporation, whose goal was to market the unique low fuel consumption vehicle. The company's main product, the Dale car, was widely covered in the press, with its claim of 70 miles per gallon coming at the time of the Arab oil embargo. Carmichael falsely promoted herself as being widowed (her husband "Jim" had supposedly died in 1966), and holding degrees in mechanical engineering and business from Ohio State University and Miami University, respectively.

Following accusations of financial impropriety at the Twentieth Century Motor Car Corporation, Carmichael was charged with 31 counts of grand theft, fraud and corporate security violations.

She went into hiding, and was featured in a 1989 episode of Unsolved Mysteries, which detailed the fraud behind the Dale for which she was a wanted fugitive.

Roughly two weeks after the episode aired, a viewer tip led police to Dale, Texas, where Carmichael was eventually found working under the alias Katherine Elizabeth Johnson, at a flower shop. She was arrested, extradited to California, tried and sent to prison. She served 18 months  in a men's prison, despite having been recognized as a woman by the courts. Carmichael died of cancer in February 2004.

In popular culture
On January 31, 2021, HBO premiered a four-part documentary titled The Lady and the Dale. Directors for the series are Nick Cammilleri and Zackary Drucker. The documentary has been described as "... a lot of stories—about fraud, flight, FBI manhunts, transgender politics, selective prosecution, bias in the media, and corruption in the courts."

On February 6, 2023, viral TikTok podcast Busted Business Bureau launched an episode in its fourth season titled Liz Carmichael: Scammer, Girlboss, Little Rascal. The episode featured host and creator Christian Borkey, as well as filmmaker Cookie Estés. It is self-described as "... everything: libertarian science fiction, engineering mishaps, three wheeled cars, stock fraud, Unsolved Mysteries, and a woman so magnetic that she girlbossed millions of dollars despite having NO PRODUCT."

References

2004 deaths
American women in business
American fraudsters
1937 births
Businesspeople from Indiana
People from Indiana
Deaths from cancer in the United States
Transgender women
20th-century American women
20th-century American people